Edgar Blackburn "Blackie" Moore (April 26, 1897 – July 22, 1980) was an American politician. A Democrat, he served in the Virginia House of Delegates 1933–1967 and was its Speaker 1950–1967, making him the second longest serving Speaker after Linn Banks.

Personal life
Moore was born in Washington, D.C. He attended Davidson College and Cornell University.  On September 8, 1920 he married Dorothy Parker of Charlotte, North Carolina.

Moore lived in Berryville, Virginia in Clarke County. He was a fruit grower and banker.

Political career
Moore entered the House of Delegates in 1933. By 1942 he had been named chair of the Confirmation Committee. He joined the Rules Committee in 1948, and was chosen as Speaker in 1950.

Moore was an alternate delegate to the 1944 Democratic National Convention, and a full delegate in 1948.

He became a member of the State Water Control Board when it was established in 1946 and served on it until 1970. He was its chair most of that period.

Later life
Moore died in Winchester, Virginia on July 22, 1980. He is buried in Greenhill Cemetery in Berryville.

Notes

References

1897 births
1980 deaths
Speakers of the Virginia House of Delegates
Democratic Party members of the Virginia House of Delegates
Davidson College alumni
Cornell University alumni
People from Berryville, Virginia
20th-century American politicians
People from Washington, D.C.